Mark Anthony Waldron Jones (born 22 October 1961) is an English former footballer who played as a full back in the Football League for Aston Villa, Brighton & Hove Albion, Birmingham City, Shrewsbury Town and Hereford United during the 1980s.

He played in the 1982 European Super Cup in which Aston Villa defeated Barcelona 3–1 on aggregate.

Honours
Aston Villa
 European Super Cup: 1982
 Intercontinental Cup runner-up: 1982

References

1961 births
Living people
People from Warley, West Midlands
English footballers
Association football defenders
Aston Villa F.C. players
Brighton & Hove Albion F.C. players
Birmingham City F.C. players
Shrewsbury Town F.C. players
Hereford United F.C. players
Worcester City F.C. players